John Wansacz (October 7, 1936 – November 15, 2014) was an American politician and businessman.

Political career
Wansacz served as a Democratic member of the Pennsylvania House of Representatives from 1965 to 1972 and 1975 to 1978.

Background
Born in Old Forge, Pennsylvania, Wansacz graduated from Old Forge High School. He then worked at Morris White Fashions. He owned Heart Lake Lodge and was on the Lackawanna County, Pennsylvania Board of Appeals.

References

People from Old Forge, Lackawanna County, Pennsylvania
Businesspeople from Pennsylvania
Democratic Party members of the Pennsylvania House of Representatives
1936 births
2014 deaths
20th-century American businesspeople